Luis Saldaña (born January 27, 1991) is an American mixed martial artist who competes in the Featherweight division of the Ultimate Fighting Championship.

Background
Having his first boxing match at eight years old, he was introduced to the sport by his father. He won the 2009 Iowa Golden Gloves and won the silver three times.

Mixed martial arts career

Early career
Saldaña compiled a 14–6 record on the regional scene, with some highlights being capturing the Ascendancy FC Featherweight Title after anocking out Will Shutt with a high kick in the first round and winning the TFS Featherweight title vagainst Ramiro Hernandez via doctor stoppage. His regional career culminated in a rear-naked choke victory in the second round against Carl Wittstock at LFA 60.

Saldaña was invited to compete at Dana White's Contender Series 34 against Vince Murdock on November 4, 2020. He won the bout via third-round technical knockout and was awarded a contract with the UFC.

Ultimate Fighting Championship
Saldaña made his debut against Jordan Griffin on April 10, 2021 at UFC on ABC 2. He won the bout via controversial unanimous decision. 16 out of 18 media scores gave it to Griffin.

In his sophomore performance, Saldaña faced Austin Lingo on August 21, 2021 at UFC on ESPN: Cannonier vs. Gastelum. He lost the fight via unanimous decision.

Saldaña faced Bruno Souza on March 26, 2022 at UFC on ESPN 33. He won the fight by unanimous decision.

Saldaña faced Sean Woodson on August 20, 2022 at UFC 278. The bout was scored a split draw.

Championships and accomplishments
Ascendancy FC
Ascendancy FC Featherweight Championship (One time)
Two successful title defenses
The Fight Series
TFS Featherweight Championship (One time)

Mixed martial arts record

|-
|Draw
|align=center|
|Sean Woodson
|Draw (split)
|UFC 278
|
|align=center|3
|align=center|5:00
|Salt Lake City, Utah, United States
|
|-
|Win
|align=center|16–7
|Bruno Souza
|Decision (unanimous)
|UFC on ESPN: Blaydes vs. Daukaus
|
|align=center|3
|align=center|5:00
|Columbus, Ohio, United States
|
|-
|Loss
|align=center|15–7
|Austin Lingo
|Decision (unanimous)
|UFC on ESPN: Cannonier vs. Gastelum
|
|align=center|3
|align=center|5:00
|Las Vegas, Nevada, United States
| 
|-
|Win
|align=center|15–6
|Jordan Griffin
|Decision (unanimous)
|UFC on ABC: Vettori vs. Holland
|
|align=center|3
|align=center|5:00
|Las Vegas, Nevada, United States
|
|-
|Win
|align=center|14–6
|Vince Murdock
|TKO (punches)
|Dana White's Contender Series 34
|
|align=center|3
|align=center|0:44
|Las Vegas, Nevada, United States
|
|-
|Win
|align=center|13–6
|Carl Wittstock
|Technical Submission (rear-naked choke) 
|LFA 60
|
|align=center|2
|align=center|4:38
|Clive, Iowa, United States
|
|-
|Win
|align=center|12–6
|Ramiro Hernandez
|TKO (doctor stoppage)
|The Fight Series
|
|align=center|2
|align=center|5:00
|West Des Moines, Iowa, United States
|
|-
|Win
|align=center|11–6
|Will Shutt
|TKO (head kick)
|Ascendancy FC 16
|
|align=center|1
|align=center|3:33
|Clive, Iowa, United States
|
|-
|Loss
|align=center|10–6
|Alex Wiggs Jr.
|Decision (unanimous)
|Brutaal Genesis Iowa: Fight Night at Hy-Vee Hall
|
|align=center|3
|align=center|5:00
|Des Moines, Iowa, United States
|
|-
|Loss
|align=center|10–5
|Mike Santiago
|TKO (punches)
|RFA 39
|
|align=center|3
|align=center|2:27
|Hammond, Indiana, United States
|
|-
|Win
|align=center|10–4
|Chris Mickle
|TKO (retirement)
|Ascendancy FC 9
|
|align=center|1
|align=center|1:07
|Clive, Iowa, United States
|
|-
|Win
|align=center|9–4
|Dyllon Muniz
|KO (punch)
|Ascendancy FC 8
|
|align=center|1
|align=center|0:53
|Clive, Iowa, United States
|
|-
|Loss
|align=center|8–4
|Anthony Baccam
|Submission (rear-naked choke)
|MCC 61
|
|align=center|3
|align=center|1:31
|Des Moines, Iowa, United States
|
|-
|Loss
|align=center|8–3
|Damien Childress
|Decision (unanimous)
|Pinnacle Combat 17
|
|align=center|3
|align=center|5:00
|Cedar Rapids, Iowa, United States
|
|-
|Win
|align=center|8–2
|Sekou Moore
|Submission (triangle choke)
|MCC 52
|
|align=center|2
|align=center|2:34
|Des Moines, Iowa, United States
|
|-
|Loss
|align=center|7–2
|Justin Lawrence
|Decision (unanimous)
|RFA 10
|
|align=center|3
|align=center|5:00
|Des Moines, Iowa, United States
|
|-
|Win
|align=center|7–1
|Prentiss Wolf
|TKO (submission to punches)
|MCC 48
|
|align=center|1
|align=center|1:51
|Des Moines, Iowa, United States
|
|-
|Win
|align=center|6–1
|Mitch Parker
|Submission (triangle choke)
|MCC 47
|
|align=center|1
|align=center|3:15
|Des Moines, Iowa, United States
|
|-
|Win
|align=center|5–1
|Nic Cox
|TKO (submission to punches)
|MCC 45
|
|align=center|1
|align=center|0:50
|Des Moines, Iowa, United States
|
|-
|Loss
|align=center|4–1
|Tom Ahrens
|Submission (rear-naked choke)
|MCC 41
|
|align=center|1
|align=center|2:18
|Des Moines, Iowa, United States
| 
|-
|Win
|align=center|4–0
|Zakk Smith
|TKO (punches)
|MCC 38
|
|align=center|3
|align=center|4:15
|Des Moines, Iowa, United States
|
|-
|Win
|align=center|3–0
|Jose Colon
|KO (punch)
|MCC 36
|
|align=center|2
|align=center|3:58
|Des Moines, Iowa, United States
|
|-
|Win
|align=center|2–0
|Orlando Peace
|Submission (rear-naked choke)
|MCC 34
|
|align=center|1
|align=center|3:56
|Des Moines, Iowa, United States
|
|-
|Win
|align=center|1–0
|Daraughn Canada
|Submission (armbar)
|MCC 32
|
|align=center|2
|align=center|2:13
|Des Moines, Iowa, United States
|

See also 
 List of current UFC fighters
 List of male mixed martial artists

References

External links 
  
 

1991 births
Living people
American male mixed martial artists
Featherweight mixed martial artists
Mixed martial artists utilizing boxing
Ultimate Fighting Championship male fighters
Sportspeople from Des Moines, Iowa
Mixed martial artists from Iowa
American male boxers